Marybank is a suburb of Nelson, New Zealand. It lies on  close to the northern end of Nelson Haven, between Atawhai and Wakapuaka.

Marybank Reserve is the settlement's local park.

The Boulder Bank, a rare rocky bank located offshore of Marybank, is accessible from just north of the settlement. It is managed by the Department of Conservation.

History

The estimated population of Marybank was 960 in 1996.

It reached 970 in 2001, 930 in 2006, 1,800 in 2013, and 1,950 in 2018.

Demography

Marybank had a population of 1,068 at the 2018 New Zealand census, an increase of 57 people (5.6%) since the 2013 census, and an increase of 162 people (17.9%) since the 2006 census. There were 444 households. There were 504 males and 567 females, giving a sex ratio of 0.89 males per female. The median age was 50.8 years (compared with 37.4 years nationally), with 168 people (15.7%) aged under 15 years, 111 (10.4%) aged 15 to 29, 519 (48.6%) aged 30 to 64, and 267 (25.0%) aged 65 or older.

Ethnicities were 94.7% European/Pākehā, 5.9% Māori, 0.8% Pacific peoples, 3.7% Asian, and 2.0% other ethnicities (totals add to more than 100% since people could identify with multiple ethnicities).

The proportion of people born overseas was 24.7%, compared with 27.1% nationally.

Although some people objected to giving their religion, 55.9% had no religion, 32.9% were Christian, 0.3% were Hindu, 0.3% were Muslim and 2.0% had other religions.

Of those at least 15 years old, 237 (26.3%) people had a bachelor or higher degree, and 123 (13.7%) people had no formal qualifications. The median income was $34,800, compared with $31,800 nationally. The employment status of those at least 15 was that 387 (43.0%) people were employed full-time, 165 (18.3%) were part-time, and 30 (3.3%) were unemployed.

Economy

In 2018, 9.2% of people worked in manufacturing, 9.2% worked in construction, 4.9% worked in hospitality, 3.8% worked in transport, 0.0% worked in finance and administration, 9.8% worked in education, and 9.2% worked in healthcare.

Transport

As of 2018, among those who commute to work, 69.6% drove a car, 4.3% rode in a car, 4.3% use a bike, and 4.3% walk or run.

Education

Clifton Terrace School is a co-educational state primary school for Year 1 to 6 students.

References

Suburbs of Nelson, New Zealand
Populated places in the Nelson Region
Populated places around Tasman Bay / Te Tai-o-Aorere